The Lakes Aquarium is an aquarium in the village of Lakeside on the southern shore of Windermere, Cumbria, England. It is one of the docking points of Windermere Lake Cruises and also at one end of the Lakeside and Haverthwaite Railway. It is the third most visited paying tourist attraction in Cumbria.

History
It opened in 1997 as The Aquarium of the Lakes when the displays followed the theme of a Lake District stream, flowing down into the lake and then on to Morecambe Bay. During 2008 it was re-branded as the  Lakes Aquarium, with a theme of the lakes of the world. The attraction is now owned by Spanish leisure company Parques Reunidos, who own and operate 67 parks across the world.

Exhibits
The Lakes Aquarium contains both freshwater and salt water aquatic animals.

Lake District
This area tells the story of the native and non native animals that can be found around the Lake District National Park. The conservation project for this area is the captive breeding and research of the endangered White Clawed Crayfish. It discusses the importance of not releasing animals from the pet trade, such as the terrapins, which can now be found surviving in the wild. All the terrapins in the aquarium were rehomed from members of the public.

Bream, Perch, Golden orfe, Koi carp,  Eurasian harvest mouse, Common toad, Red-eared terrapins.

Asia
Oriental small-clawed otter

Africa
Lake Malawi cichlids, bell hidgeback tortoise, elephantnose,upside-down catfish,convict cichlids.

Americas
Angelfish, blind cave fish, common plec, cory catfish, red-bellied piranha, rummy nosed tetra, lemon tetra, severum, axolotl.

Lakes
Arctic char, ballan wrasse, barbel, beadlet anemone, bib, Bloody Henry, bream tubercles, brill, brook trout, butterfish or gunnel, chub, cod, coley, common bream, common carp, common hermit crab, common pochard, common seahorse, common starfish, common sunstar, Connemara clingfish, crucian carp, cuckoo wrasse, dahlia anemone, diving ducks. edible crab, flatfish, flounder, European lobster, European sea sturgeon, European plaice, giant wels catfish, perch, roach, rudd, sea anemones, sea bream, seahorse, starfish, tench, tufted duck.

Weirs
chub, golden tench.

Marine
beadlet anemone, butterfish, common hermit crab, common starfish, common sunstar, Connemara clingfish, goby, blenny, cushion starfish, cuckoo wrasse, dahlia anemone, snakelock anemone, peacock worms, lumpsuckers, spiny starfishEuropean plaice, purple sunstar, big bellied seahorse

Morecambe Bay
Seabass, pollock, turbot, lesser spotted catashark, greater spotted cat shark, thornback ray, wrasse

Virtual Diving Bell
The Virtual Diving bell incorporates images of underwater scenes displayed on three two metre diameter semi-spherical CG graphics screens.

References

External links

Aquaria in England
Tourist attractions in Cumbria
1997 establishments in England
Parques Reunidos
Colton, Cumbria